Below is a list of notable people who were born in Negros Occidental, or those who lived there for an extended period.

Arts, culture and media

Architecture
 Leandro Locsin — National artist for architecture

Film
 Peque Gallaga — multi-awarded filmmaker
 Ronnie Lazaro — a Gawad Urian Award-winning Filipino film and television actor, producer and casting and art director
 Susan Roces — award-winning actress, nicknamed Queen of Philippine Movies, widow of Fernando Poe Jr., adoptive mother of Grace Poe
 Joel Torre — actor, director and film producer
 Reiven Bulado — 2004 MMFF best supporting actor, ramp model, and entrepreneur
 Bernard Bonnin — actor
 Pancho Magalona — award-winning actor
 Erik Matti —  director, screenwriter, producer
 Rosemarie Sonora — actress
 Charles Gemora — Hollywood makeup-artist, special effects pioneer and actor
 Rey "PJ" Abellana — film and TV actor
 Carla Abellana — film and TV actress

Literature
 Adelina Gurrea — journalist, poet and playwright in Spanish
 Elsa Martinez Coscolluela — award-winning poet, short-story writer, and playwright
 Gilbert Luis R. Centina III — prize-winning poet and author
 Alex Lacson — writer, lawyer and philanthropist

Music
 Bobby Enriquez — jazz pianist
 Kuh Ledesma — popular jazz and pop singer. Known as the Pop Diva of the Philippines
 Noven Belleza — It's Showtime Tawag ng Tanghalan grand winner

Publishing
 Raul Locsin — editor, publisher and founder of BusinessWorld Ramon Magsaysay Award recipient.
 Teodoro Locsín Sr. — editor of the Philippines Free Press

Television
 Allan K. — singer, comedian, actor and TV host
 Alvin Elchico — TV/radio host, former provincial correspondent for MagTV na Amiga
 Rio Diaz — former beauty queen, TV host and actress
 Romy Pastrana — comedian and Goin' Bulilit member under the name Dagul. Uncle of Joey Pastrana
 Elizabeth Ramsey — comedian, singer and actress
 Christian Vasquez — actor, model for Pond's and a former housemate of ABS-CBN's Pinoy Big Brother: Pinoy Big Brother: Celebrity Edition

Theater
 Eduardo Varela Sicangco — scene designer and illustrator for Broadway, opera and film

Visual arts
 Alfredo Alcala — comic book artist for DC and Marvel Comics
 Alfonso A. Ossorio — abstract expressionist artist

Athletes

Basketball

 Francis Arnaiz — Former basketball player in the Philippine Basketball Association for Toyota Super Corollas and Barangay Ginebra Kings
 Nonoy Baclao — Professional basketball player who plays for the Talk 'N Text Tropang Texters in the Philippine Basketball Association. He also played for the Philippine Patriots in the ASEAN Basketball League and as a collegiate player for the Ateneo Blue Eagles in the UAAP
 Noli Locsin — Retired basketball player who spent most of his career for the Ginebra San Miguel franchise in the Philippine Basketball Association
 Jeffrei Chan — Professional basketball player who plays for the Rain or Shine Elasto Painters in the Philippine Basketball Association and member of Gilas Pilipinas in the 2014 FIBA World Cup
 Rudy Distrito — Retired Professional Basketball player in the Philippine Basketball Association 
 Boyet Fernandez — Current head coach of the NLEX Road Warriors in the PBA D-League and San Beda Red Lions in the NCAA. Former head coach of the now defunct Sta. Lucia Realtors in the PBA and UP Fighting Maroons in the UAAP
 Reynel Hugnatan — Professional basketball player who plays for the Meralco Bolts in the Philippine Basketball Association
 LA Revilla — Professional basketball player for Mahindra Enforcer in the Philippine Basketball Association
 James Yap — Professional basketball player who plays for the San Mig Super Coffee Mixers in the Philippine Basketball Association and a former member of the Philippines national basketball team
 Mark Yee — Professional basketball player who plays for the GlobalPort Batang Pier in the Philippine Basketball Association

Bowls
Sonia Bruce —  International lawn bowler, bronze medalist at the 2016 World Bowls Championship
Ainie Knight — International lawn and indoor bowler, bronze medalist at the 2012 World Bowls Championship

Boxing

 Rolando Bohol — Former IBF world flyweight champion
 Leopoldo Cantancio — Retired boxer who competed at two Summer Olympic Games. He also won a bronze medal in the 1990 Asian Games
 Godfrey Castro — 2007 SEA Games silver medalist and 2006 Asian Games bronze medalist (flyweight)
 Francisco Guilledo — More commonly known as Pancho Villa, First Filipino World Champion boxer, World flyweight champion and IBHOF International Boxing Hall of Fame and WBHOF World Boxing Hall of Fame Inductee
 Small Montana (Benjamin Gan) — Won the Flyweight Championship of the World (as recognized by New York state)
 Eleuterio Zapanta — World bantamweight champion in 1940 and World flyweight champion in 1941
 Dodie Boy Peñalosa — Two Division World Champion and former IBF champion in the light flyweight and flyweight classes
 Gerry Peñalosa — Two Division World Champion and former holder of the WBC super flyweight and the WBO bantamweight titles
 Sonny Boy Jaro — Former The Ring and WBC Flyweight World Champion
 Eric Jamili — Retired professional boxer and former WBO minimumweight Champion.
 Mark Jason Melligen — Professional boxer
 Donnie Nietes — Three Division World Champion and former WBO Minimumweight World Champion, former WBO & The Ring Light Flyweight Champion and former IBF Flyweight Champion
 Elias Recaido — Competed in the 1996 Summer Olympics. He won a bronze medal at the 1990 Asian Games
 Merlito Sabillo — Former holder of the WBO Minimumweight world title
 Leopoldo Serantes — 1988 Seoul Olympics bronze medalist
 Genesis Servania — Professional Boxer
 Joan Tipon — 2006 Doha Asian Games gold medalist (bantamweight)
 Mansueto Velasco, Jr. — 1996 Summer Olympic Games Silver Medalist
 Roel Velasco — 1992 Summer Olympics Bronze Medalist
 Ben Villaflor — WBA world junior lightweight (now called super featherweight) champion during the 1970s
 Young Tommy — Retired professional boxer
 Rogen Ladon — Competed at the 2016 Summer Olympics in the Men's light flyweight division

Chess
Alekhine Nouri — youngest FIDE Master at age 7

Football

 Manuel Amechazurra — The first Filipino footballer to play in the European football circuit, he was called El Capitán and played as a defender, from 1905 to 1915 for FC Barcelona
 Arsenio Lacson - Former member of the Philippines national football team and participated in tournaments such as the 1934 Far Eastern Championship Games
 Florentino Broce — Former member and coach for the Philippines national football team  
 Dave Fegidero — Former member of the Philippines national football team 
 Norman Fegidero — Former member and coach for the Philippines national football team  
 Troy Fegidero - Former member of the Philippines national football team 
 Ali Go — Former member of the Philippines national football team and the Philippines national futsal team 
 Tating Pasilan — Former member of the Philippines national football team and the Philippines national futsal team. He also played for the Green Archers United in the defunct United Football League
 Robert Cañedo — Professional footballer for JPV Marikina in the Philippines Football League and former member of the Philippines national football team
 Alesa Dolino - Defender for the Philippines women's national football team. She also plays for OutKast F.C. in the PFF Women's League
 Eduard Sacapaño — Professional footballer who plays as a goalkeeper for Ceres-Negros F.C. in the Philippines Football League and a former member of the Philippines national football team
 Camelo Tacusalme - Professional footballer who plays as a defender for JPV Marikina in the Philippines Football League
 Joshua Beloya — Professional football player who plays as a striker for Ilocos United in the Philippines Football League. Former member of the Philippines national U-23 football team and the Philippines national beach soccer team

Golf
 Juvic Pagunsan —professional golfer, Asian Tour Order of Merit champion

Martial arts

 Monsour del Rosario — taekwondo champion who has also starred in several Filipino and international action films. He won bronze in the 1985 World Taekwondo Championships
 Randy Mengullo — initiated the Jack and Jill School karate program, a Sandan Blackbelt in  who garnered medals in many karatedo championships and athletic meet of different schools and karate organizations in the Philippines
 Ernesto Presas — martial artist, founder of Filipino martial arts system Kombatan
 Remy Presas — Father of Modern Arnis
 Remy P. Presas — arnisador, martial artist

Pool
 Ramil Gallego — professional pool player

Softball
 Queeny Sabobo — softball player, gold medalist at the 2015 Southeast Asian Games

Swimming
 Carlo Piccio — Olympic swimmer

Volleyball
 Fille Cainglet–Cayetano — Volleyball player for both the Meralco Power Spikers of the Shakey's V-League (SVL) and the Petron Blaze Spikers of the Philippine Super Liga
 Melissa Gohing - Team captain and libero of the Pocari Sweat Lady Warriors in the Premier Volleyball League

Beauty queens
 Aurora Pijuan — Miss International 1970
 Vickie Rushton — Lin-ay sang Negros 2009, Mutya ng Pilipinas 2011 , Pinoy Big Brother: All In Housemate
 Sandra Seifert — Miss Philippines Earth 2009, International Fashion Model.
 Margaret Nales Wilson — Binibining Pilipinas-World 2007, TV personality and actress

Business
 Tan Yu —Billionaire Philanthropist, was ranked the richest man in the Philippines

Government service and diplomacy

International organization
 Rafael M. Salas — former United Nations Under-Secretary General, Executive Director UNFPA, Executive Secretary to Ferdinand Marcos
 Jorge B. Vargas — Member, World Scout Committee, de facto Head of the Philippine Government during World War II, Executive Secretary to Manuel Quezon
 Teodoro Locsin Jr. — Permanent Representative of the Philippines to the United Nations, former Congressional Representative, and journalist

National government

 Rafael Alunan — Former Secretary of Agriculture of Manuel Quezon and Jose P. Laurel
 Daniel Lacson Jr. — Former Governor of Negros Occidental Chairman of Philippine National Bank  cabinet secretary for countryside development Fidel v Ramos and Chairman GSIS
 Dennis Mapa  Politician
 Mercedes Alvarez — Deputy Speaker of The House of Representatives of the Philippines
 Jose Miguel Arroyo — Former First Gentleman of the Philippines.
 Iggy Arroyo — Representative 5th District of Negros Occidental, brother in law of former Philippine President Gloria Arroyo.
 Francisco Chavez —  Former Solicitor General of the Philippines
 Neri Colmenares  — Former Party-list Congressman for Bayan Muna
 Raul M. Gonzalez — Former Secretary of Justice (Philippines)
 Rowena Guanzon — Commissioner Commission on Elections (Philippines)
 Emilio Hilado  — Former Associate Justice of the Supreme Court of the Philippines during World War II
 Oscar R. Ledesma — former Senator
 Jose Locsin — former Senator and Secretary of Health.
 Enrique B. Magalona — former Senator, grandfather of the late Francis Magalona.
 Alfredo Montelibano, Sr. — politician and industrialist, served as Mayor of Bacolod governor of Negros Occidental, and Philippine Secretary of National Defense and Interior.
 Gil Montilla — Speaker of the National Assembly
 Ruperto Montinola — former Senator
 Enrique Ona — former Secretary of Health (Philippines)
 Monico Puentevella — politician, former Representative Lone District of Bacolod, former Commissioner of Philippine Sports Commission and former Mayor of Bacolod.
 Rolando Ramos Dizon — Former chairman of the Commission on Higher Education. La Sallian Brother
 Judy Taguiwalo — Secretary of the Department of Social Welfare and Development
 Haydee Yorac — former Chairman of the Commission on Elections (Philippines).
 Jose Yulo — former Speaker of the House of Representatives of the Philippines, former Secretary of Justice under Manuel Quezon, Chief Justice of the Supreme Court of the Philippines during World War II, Former Secretary of Labor, and served as Secretary of Justice again under Ferdinand Marcos.

Local government
 Ramon Bagatsing — longest serving Mayor of Manila (1971–1986), Manila Congressman (1957–1971) and Plaza Miranda bombing survivor.
 Guia Gomez — Mayor of San Juan City, known for relationship with former Philippine President Joseph Estrada, with whom she has a son, Senator JV Ejercito
 Arsenio Lacson - Broadcaster, first elected Mayor of Manila. former Manila Congressman
 Evelio Leonardia — Mayor of Bacolod and former Congressional Representative 
 Alfredo G. Marañon, Jr. — Governor of Negros Occidental and former Congressional Representative
 Jose Maria Zubiri Jr. — Former Governor of Bukidnon, Former Representative of Third District of Bukidnon

Historical figures

 Juan Araneta — Led the Negros Revolution
 Aniceto Lacson — Led the Negros Revolution
 Antonio Ledesma Jayme — Revolutionary
 Papa Isio — Revolutionary
 Yves Leopold Germain Gaston — Sugar Baron

Military service
 Mary Grace Baloyo  — Philippine Medal of Valor Recipient, the nation's highest military honor, First Lieutenant Philippine Air Force

Religion
 Niall O'Brien — Irish Columban missionary priest, writer of the Hiligaynon language bible
 Antonio Fortich — Former Bishop of Bacolod, political activist and Ramon Magsaysay Award recipient
 Vicente Salgado y Garrucho — Former Bishop of the Roman Catholic Diocese of Romblon 
 Jesus Y Varela — Bishop Emeritus of the Roman Catholic Diocese of Sorsogon, former president, Philippine Federation of Catholic Broadcasters

Scientists and innovators
 Raul Fabella, National Scientist of the Philippines for Economics
 Angel Alcala, National Scientist of the Philippines for Biological science
 Gavino Trono, National Scientist of the Philippines for Marine Biology
 Oscar H. Ibarra — theoretical computer scientist, known for his works on automata theory, formal language, and Computational complexity theory
 Katherine Luzuriaga — Immunologist, developed a functioning cure for HIV infected infants. Included in the Time 100 list of the most influential people in the world for 2013

Others
 Jose Vasquez Aguilar — Ramon Magsaysay Award recipient 
 Rose Lacson-Porteous — Australian-Filipino socialite
 Tony Meloto — Philanthropist, founder of Gawad Kalinga
 Carl and Clarence Aguirre — Former conjoined twins.
 Captain Felix Corteza Gaston, Philippine Airlines pilot at the centre of one of the world's first hijacking.

Notable people with roots from Negros Occidental

 Mikey Arroyo — son of former Philippine President Gloria Arroyo, member Philippine House of Representatives
 Diosdado Macapagal Arroyo — also known as Dato Arroyo — son of former President Gloria Macapagal Arroyo, member Philippine House of Representatives
 Ginger Conejero — Former Miss Philippines Earth runner-up and a TV entertainment reporter and host for ABS-CBN
 Sheryl Cruz — Actress on film and television
 Joe Devance — Basketball player who currently plays for the San Mig Coffee Mixers in the Philippine Basketball Association
 Chuckie Dreyfus — Actor on film and television 
 Joseph Victor Ejercito — Son of former Phil President Joseph Estrada, member Philippine House of Representatives
 Charlene Gonzales — Television and film personality and former beauty queen
 Mark Hartmann — Professional footballer who plays as a striker for Malaysian club Sarawak FA and member of the Philippines national football team
 Matthew Hartmann — Professional footballer who plays as a midfielder for Global Cebu F.C. in the Philippines Football League and former member of the Philippines national football team
 Ryan Hall - Professional footballer who plays as a midfielder for Meralco Manila in the Philippines Football League
 Martin Steuble — Member of the Philippines national football team and a professional football player for the Ceres-Negros F.C. in the Philippines Football League. His mother is from Bacolod
 Jaya — Soul Diva and Asia's Queen of Soul
 Angel Locsin — Actress and commercial model
 Elmo Magalona — Actor and singer 
 Francis Magalona — Former actor, TV host, master rapper and also VJ on Channel V Philippines and MTV Philippines
 Frank Magalona — Actor and rapper
 Maxene Magalona — Actress in film and television
 Saab Magalona — Actress, singer, photographer and blogger
 Raimund Marasigan — Pinoy rock musician and icon
 Liza Araneta Marcos - Lawyer, First Lady of the Philippines 
 Sandro Marcos - Member of the Philippine House of Representatives
 Tomas Osmeña — Member of the Philippine House of Representatives,  Mayor of Cebu City
 Sergio Osmeña III — Senator
 Hiro Peralta — Actor 
 AJ Perez — Former film and television actor
 Sue Ramirez - ABS-CBN young artist. Her mother is from Sipalay.
 Mar Roxas — Secretary of Transportation and communication, former Trade Secretary, Senator and Vice-Presidential candidate, President of the Liberal Party (Philippines)
 Lea Salonga — Tony and Laurence Olivier award-winning actress and singer
 Juan Miguel Zubiri — Senator

References 

Negros Occidental